The Socialist Party (SP) was a minor left-wing political party in South Korea, founded in 1998. It advocated an ideology of socialism, social republicanism, peace and environmentalism.

On 19 February 2012, at its final Sixteenth Party Congress, the Socialist Party voted by 404 votes to 54 to merge with the New Progressive Party. The party was formally dissolved on 4 March 2012.

History
The People's Victory 21 party (the later DLP) was formed in preparation for the presidential election of 1997. This was an attempt to unite South Korean progressives in a single party, but dissenting progressives who focused on class struggle argued that there was an excess of nationalism in the VoP21 platform. As an example, they pointed to the slogan of Kwon Young-ghil, VoP21's presidential candidate, "Stand up, Korea!". After the election, these dissenting progressives formed the "Youth Progressive Party".

The Youth Progressive Party ran for election to the National Assembly in the Guro-gu local constituency, and attained 4.1% of the votes cast. In August 2001, the party changed its name to "Socialist Party" under the slogan "Against Capitalism, Against WPK", targeting certain nationalists known as the "NL" (National Liberation) faction within the Democratic Labor Party.

The party changed its name to "Hope Socialist Party" in April 2006, and to "Korea Socialist Party" in October 2006 due to the Korean law forbidding the usage of a party name for four years when registration is canceled.

In the 2008 parliamentary elections, the party amassed less than 3% of the vote, and the national election committee consequently canceled its registration. In November, the party re-registered with the name "Socialist Party".

Elections
On several occasions, the party ran candidates for president or parliament, for example Kim Yeong-gyu in the 2002 presidential election, but it never won any elections.

For the 2007 presidential election, Geum Min ran as the party's candidate for president. He proposed the idea of social republicanism, subsequently adopted as a component of the party's platform.

Election results

President

Legislature

See also
List of political parties in South Korea
Politics of South Korea
Elections in South Korea
Basic income
Basic Income Party
Socialism in South Korea
Progressivism in South Korea

References

External links

 
Progressivism in South Korea
Universal basic income in South Korea